The 7th Asian Swimming Championships were swum March 5–10, 2006 at the Singapore Sports School in Singapore. The championships was organized by the Asia Swimming Federation (AASF), and featured competition in 40 long course Swimming events.

Participating nations
Nations with swimmers at the 2006 Asian Championships included:

Event schedule
All events were swum prelims and finals (save the 800 and 1500 freestyles), with the top-8 finishers from prelims advancing to swim a second time in finals. The 800 and 1500 free events were swum as timed-final (i.e. each swimmer only swam once).

Results

Men

Women

Medal table

See also
Swimming at the 2006 Asian Games

References

Asian Championships